Christmas in Vienna may refer to:

 Christmas in Vienna (album), a 1993 album Diana Ross, Plácido Domingo and José Carreras 
 Christmas in Vienna (film), a 1997 Croatian film directed by Branko Schmidt
 Christmas in Vienna (event), a music event held regularly in Vienna, Austria

See also
 Christmas in Vienna II, the second album in the series
 Christmas in Vienna III, the third album in the series
 Christmas in Vienna VI, the seventh album in the series